The Ner is a river in central Poland approximately   long, with sources to the south-east of Łódź. Running through the Łódzkie and Wielkopolskie provinces, it is one of the right tributaries of the Warta River (the third largest river in Poland), and the largest river in Łódź.

References

 Lesiński A., Zanieczyszczenie Neru, [in:] Na sieradzkich szlakach, nr 1/1998, s. 5-7
 Witold Mańczak, Praojczyzna Słowian, Warszawa 1981, s. 18
 Ryszard Bonisławski. Rzeka Ner. Z biegiem łódzkich rzek, 2008. Wydawnictwo Uniwersytetu Łódzkiego, Łódź.
 Bieżanowski W., Łódka i inne rzeki łódzkie, Towarzystwo Opieki nad Zabytkami Oddział w Łodzi, Łódź ZORA 2001

Rivers of Poland
Rivers of Łódź Voivodeship